Flodqvist is a Swedish surname. Notable people with the surname include:

Anders Flodqvist (born 1959), Swedish water polo player
Thord Flodqvist (1926–1988), Swedish ice hockey goaltender
Thom Flodqvist (born 1990), Swedish ice hockey centre 

Swedish-language surnames